The Kostolac Coal Mine is a coal mine in Serbia. The mine is located in Kostolac in Braničevo District. The mine has coal reserves amounting to 809 million tonnes of lignite, one of the largest lignite reserves in Europe, and it produces 5.7 million tonnes of coal per year.

See also
 TPP Kostolac

References

Coal mines in Serbia
Open-pit mines